The New Orleans Pelicans are an American professional basketball team based in New Orleans. They play in the Southwest Division of the Western Conference in the National Basketball Association (NBA).

History 
The team was born out of the original Hornets' relocation to New Orleans in 2002. The team has had three names since its inception; it was called the New Orleans Hornets (2002–2005; 2007–2013), the New Orleans / Oklahoma City Hornets (2005–2007), and the New Orleans Pelicans (2013–present). The Pelicans have never been to the NBA Finals since its inception. The team has played their home games at the Smoothie King Center(formerly the New Orleans Arena) since 2002. The Pelicans are owned by Gayle Benson, with Trajan Langdon as their general manager.

Coaches
There have been seven head coaches for the Pelicans. The franchise's first head coach was Paul Silas, who coached for one season. Byron Scott is the franchise's all-time leader for the most regular-season games coached (419), the most regular-season game wins (203), the most playoff games coached (17), and the most playoff-game wins (8). Paul Silas has franchise record for the highest winning percentage in the regular season (.573). Bower's only head coaching job was with the Pelicans. No Pelicans head coach has been elected into the Basketball Hall of Fame as a coach. The Pelicans' fifth head coach was Monty Williams, who was appointed on June 7, 2010.

On June 16, 2021, the Pelicans mutually parted ways with Stan Van Gundy who coached the team for one season.

Statistics

Key

Notes
 A running total of the number of coaches of the Hornets/Pelicans. Thus, any coach who has two or more separate terms as head coach is only counted once.
 Each year is linked to an article about that particular NBA season.

References
General

Specific

Lists of National Basketball Association head coaches by team

Head coach